Gim Seong-su or Kim Song-su may also refer to:

Kim Seong-su (1891–1955) was a South Korean educator, journalist and politician.
Kim Sung-su (director) (born 1961), South Korean film director
Kim Sung-soo (actor) (born 1973), South Korean actor
Kim Sung-soo (footballer) (born 1963), South Korean footballer
Kim Seong-soo (footballer) (born 1992), South Korean footballer